The 1987 Mediterranean Games football tournament was the 10th edition of the Mediterranean Games men's football tournament. The football tournament was held in Latakia, Syria between 15 and 25 September 1987 as part of the 1987 Mediterranean Games and was contested by 8 teams. The host team Syria won the golden medal.

Participating teams
8 teams took part in the tournament.

System
The 8 teams were divided into two groups of four teams. Teams are awarded two points for a win and one for a draw. No points are awarded for a defeat. The top two sides in each group will advance to the semi-finals.

Squads

Venues

Tournament
All times local : CET (UTC+2)

Group stage

Group A

Group B

Knockout stage

Semi-finals

Third place match

Final

Tournament classification

References

1987
Sports at the 1987 Mediterranean Games
1987–88 in French football
1987–88 in Turkish football
1987–88 in Greek football
1987 in African football
1987 in Asian football
1987
1987 in San Marino